Garrigus is a surname. Notable people with the surname include:

Alice Belle Garrigus (1858–1949), American religious figure
Carl Garrigus (1931–1975), American football player
Charles B. Garrigus (1914–2000), American poet
Harry L. Garrigus (1876–1968), American animal scientist and educator
Robert Garrigus (born 1977), American golfer
Thomas Garrigus (1946–2006), American athlete

See also
 Garrigues (disambiguation)
Fred Garrigus Holloway (1898–1988), American educator